Spring is a 1969 Estonian film directed by Arvo Kruusement and is a film adaptation of Oskar Luts' popular novel of the same name. The movie placed first place in the Estonian feature films top ten poll held in 2002 by Estonian film critics and journalists. In 1970 the movie sold 558,000 tickets in Estonia, then nearly half of the country's total population of 1.36 million and 8,100,000 in the Soviet Union in 1971. The film was re-released in Estonia on 13 April 2006.

The film was shot in Palamuse, which was the prototype area of Oskar Luts' "Paunvere". It was followed by three sequels: 1976's Summer (Suvi), 1990's Autumn (Sügis) and 2020's Winter (Talve), all of which included original actors from this film.

Cast
 Arno Liiver as Arno Tali
 Riina Hein as Raja Teele
 Aare Laanemets as Joosep Toots
 Margus Lepa as Georg Aadniel Kiir
 Ain Lutsepp as Tõnisson
 Leonhard Merzin as Teacher Laur
 Kaljo Kiisk as Kristjan Lible
 Rein Aedma as Jaan Imelik
 Kalle Eomois as Kuslap
 Raul Haaristo	as Vipper
 Heikki Koort as Peterson
 Heido Selmet as Visak
 Endel Ani as Sacristan aka Julk-Jüri
 Tõnu Alveus as Lesta
 Ita Ever as Arno's mother
 Silvia Laidla as Köögi-Liisa	
 Ervin Abel as Papa Kiir

References

External links
 
 

1969 films
Soviet-era Estonian films
Films set in Estonia
Soviet black-and-white films
Films based on Estonian novels
Films shot in Estonia
Estonian novels adapted into films
Tallinnfilm films
Estonian drama films
Estonian black-and-white films
Soviet teen films
Estonian-language films